Březí may refer to places in the Czech Republic:

 Březí (Břeclav District), a municipality and village in the South Moravian Region
 Březí (Prague-East District), a municipality and village in the Central Bohemian Region
 Březí (Strakonice District), a municipality and village in the South Bohemian Region
 Březí (Žďár nad Sázavou District), a municipality and village in the Vysočina Region
 Březí nad Oslavou, a municipality and village in the Vysočina Region
 Vlachovo Březí, a town in the South Bohemian Region
 Březí, a village and administrative part of Čachrov in the Plzeň Region
 Březí, a village and administrative part of Ctiboř in the Plzeň Region
 Březí, a village and administrative part of Dražíč in the South Bohemian Region
 Březí, a village and administrative part of Kamenice nad Lipou in the South Bohemian Region
 Březí, a village and administrative part of Kamenný Újezd in the South Bohemian Region
 Březí, a village and administrative part of Kluky in the South Bohemian Region
 Březí, a village and administrative part of Kovářov in the South Bohemian Region
 Březí, a village and administrative part of Malečov in the Ústí nad Labem Region
 Březí, a village and administrative part of Meclov in the Plzeň Region
 Březí, a village and administrative part of Nechvalice in the Central Bohemian Region
 Březí, a village and administrative part of Pernarec in the Plzeň Region
 Březí, a village and administrative part of Slabčice in the South Bohemian Region
 Březí, a village and administrative part of Trhové Sviny in the South Bohemian Region
 Březí, a village and administrative part of Zbýšov in the Central Bohemian Region
 Březí, a village and administrative part of Zhoř in the South Bohemian Region
 Březí, a village and administrative part of Žinkovy in the Plzeň Region
 Březí u Týna nad Vltavou, a former village and administrative part of Temelín in the South Bohemian Region